Baswich Priory was a priory in Staffordshire, England.

References

Monasteries in Staffordshire